The West Harbour Rugby Football Club is a team in the Shute Shield, the premier club rugby union football competition in New South Wales. The club is based in Concord in the Inner West of Sydney, and plays home matches at Concord Oval. Concord holds a place in rugby history as a venue for the inaugural Rugby World Cup in 1987. West Harbour's major sponsor is Burwood RSL and post match functions are held at Club Burwood. In 2020, the Pirates would play out of Drummoyne Oval as Concord Oval being NRL club Wests Tigers' training ground, the venue was deemed off limited for people in excess of the "bubble".

Club information 

Uniform colours: Black, White and Red
Premiership Titles: 2 titles: 1902, 1929

Club history 

Beginnings

West Harbour R.F.C. was founded in 1900 as Western Suburbs D.R.U.F.C after an amalgamation between Burwood and Concord rugby clubs. The club originally fielded only two grade teams but still won the Sydney Premiership at its third attempt in 1902. Since then the club has won one other championship in 1929.

The Club’s name was changed to Western Suburbs to satisfy municipal aldermen when it sought a lease on St Lukes Oval, later Concord Oval. Western Suburbs’ boundaries were far-reaching in its early days because the club could draw on players from Concord to the Harbour, south to Port Hacking, north to the Parramatta River, and west to the Blue Mountains. When Parramatta, St George, Drummoyne, Gordon and Eastwood joined the competition these boundaries were reduced.

Between the Wars

Western Suburbs enjoyed a golden era after the war when Secretary Francis Joseph Herlihy co-opted Tom.S.R (Iron Guts) Davis, Larry Wogan, and Charlie Rea to help lift the club’s fortunes. They built a playing strength that enabled Western Suburbs to figure prominently in the competition for years and to win the competition in 1929

The brothers Geoff (1929) and Keith Storey (1936) entered international football from Western Suburbs followed by Sid King (1929), M.R.Blair (1931), T.S.Lawton (1929), A.Thorpe (1929), P.K.Collins (1937), R.L.F.Kelly (1936), R.E.M.McLaughlin (1936), T.P.Pauling (1936), and Cecil Ramalli (1938). Phil Hardcastle was an established Test player when he joined the club from Easts in 1948.

Relegation and Promotion

Western Suburbs were unceremoniously relegated to the second division in 1952 and fared poorly until promoted back into 1st Division in 1966. It was at this point that the club’s fortunes changed when Rufus Miahere joined as 1st Grade coach in 1970. Miahere began with seven wins in 1971 and eight wins in 1972. In 1973 he lifted the Club back to the glory it had enjoyed in the 1930s by winning 17 matches in a row. Western Suburbs won the Club Championships that year and the season was flawed only by a loss to Randwick in the Grand Final. That year Laurie Monaghan became the Club’s first test player since World War II, followed shortly after by one of Sydney’s true Rugby characters, Mick Ellem.

The Club was once again relegated to 2nd Division in 1980 and then promoted back to 1st Division in 1981. In 1982, the Club had discussions with the Sydney Rugby Union regarding the upgrade of Concord Oval. The Club made a donation of $250,000 to the NSWRU, which allowed the State Government to provide a further $1 million and saw Concord Oval transformed into a world class rugby venue, which in 1987 saw more than 25,000 people attend the World Cup semi-final match between Australia and France.

Resurgence and Professionalism

The 1980s and '90s saw a resurgence in the Club’s strength. Stephen James represented Australia in a number of Test series from 1986 and Fili Finau wore the green and gold on a French Tour in 1993. 

In 1995, the Club changed its name to the West Harbour Rugby Football Club to more truly reflect the Club’s location in the inner west of the harbour city. In 1997, Fili Finau once again represented Australia, this time against New Zealand in the Bledisloe Cup. Jason Madz and Fili Finau also featured prominently for the NSW Super 12 side during this period. 

Steve Devine represented NSW and Australia U/21s and played with the Waratahs before signing a Super 12 contract with the Auckland Blues. Steve was then selected as a member of the All Blacks eventually playing 13 tests for New Zealand. Pierre Hola capped off a fine 2001 season by being selected in the Tongan national team and was a member of the Tongan 2003 World Cup Squad.

In 2000/01 Des Tuiavii played for the ACT Brumbies before taking up a NSW Waratahs contract for the 2002/03 seasons. Des won both the Sydney Morning Herald’s Player of the Year and the NSWRU Ken Catchpole Medal in 2001 and played his 100th 1st Grade game for West Harbour in 2003. Des finished a remarkable 2003 season by playing for the Samoan side in the 2003 World Cup.

In the early to mid 2000s, West Harbour had a number of players in the NSW Waratah and Junior Waratah squads including Lote Tuqiri, Timana Tahu, Chris O’Young and Elia Tiqiri all represented the Waratahs in 2004. Chris Siale and Rodney Blake represented the Australia U/21 side in the IRB Championships in Scotland. Both subsequently signed Super 12 contracts. 

Seven West Harbour players Penny Anderson, Louise Ferris, Charmain Smith, Debby Hodgkinson, Tui Ormsby, Nyree Osieck, Pearl Palaialii represented the Australian Wallaroos at the Women’s Rugby World Cup in Spain in 2002. Debby Hodgkinson was named the SMH “Player of the Year” for the 2004 season.

The Current Era

Since 2010, the Club’s fortunes have been mixed with periods of strong success and frustrating disappointments. With a seemingly transient playing population and a number of successive short term presidents and coaches, the Club has lacked a great deal of stability and has seen a high turnover of players.  

The tenure of experienced coach, Tod Louden, which came to an end at the culmination of the 2018 season saw another mass exodus of players. Yet the Club’s newly appointed board acted quickly to engage long time club man, Mark Gudmenson, as Head Coach, who in turn was successful season in bringing a sense of stability to the Club for the 2019 season driven by a competitive 1st Grade team. 

West Harbour is leaving Concord Oval in the 2020 season for two years as Canada Bay Council build a new state of the art stadium. The Club will be playing its home matches at Drummoyne Oval for the next two years, after which time West Harbour will return to Concord Oval, which will be the envy of the eleven Clubs in the Shute Shield. 

Representatives

Overall 48 players who have played for the Club have gone on to represent the Wallabies, along with the large number of Wallabies and Wallaroos representative players. Due to the diverse nature of West Harbour Rugby Club, 36 players have gone on to represent other nations in international rugby including Samoa, Tonga, Fiji, Wales, Ireland, Scotland, New Zealand, the Philippines, Malta, Croatia and Lebanon. 

89 players have been selected for representative honours with the New South Wales Waratahs and many others have played with other Super Rugby franchises.

International representatives

 Stanley Wickham
 Warden Clarrie Prentice
 Larry Wogan
 Clarence S. Prentice
 Thomas S. R. Davies
 Roger Barton
 Thomas S. Lawton
 George McKay
 John W. Shute
 Reginald E. Lane
 Alexander Armstrong
 Hugh Buntine
 Harry W. Bryant
 P. Bruce Judd
 Sid King
 Geoff Storey
 Malcolm R. Blair
 Harold Bartley
 Eric Bardsley

 John O'Donnell
 George Gordon
 Alan Thorpe
 P. K. Collins
 Russell L. F. Kelly
 R. E. M. Bill McLaughlin
 Thomas P. Pauling
 Keith Storey
 Paul K. Collins
 Cecil Ramalli
 Phil Hardcastle
 James Walsh
 Geoffrey Vaughan
 Barry Stumbles
 Laurence Monaghan
 Michael Ellem
 Stephen L. K. James
 Anthony Daly
 Michael Foley

 Fili Finau
 W. K. (Bill) Young
 Lote Tuqiri
 Matthew J Dunning
 Rodney Blake
 Timana Tahu
 James O'Connor
 Salesi Ma'afu
 Scott Sio
 Taqele Naiyaravoro
 Allan Alaalatoa

Former players who have represented other nations

  Fergus Keogh, (Ireland)
  Tali Kavapalu, (Tonga)
  Watisoni Nasalo, (Fiji)
  Zoran Prijic, (Yugoslavia)
  Richard Moriarty, (Wales)
  Paul Moriarty, (Wales)
  Vili Ala'alatoa, (Samoa)
  Fetaiaki Langi, (Tonga)
  Fua Veiru, (Samoa)
  Dan Parks, (Scotland)
  Steve Devine, (New Zealand)
  Pierre Hola, (Tonga)
  Des Tuiavi'i, (Samoa)
  Campese Ma'afu,
  Sitiveni Mafi,
  Matthew Jarrett,
  Ben Abood,
  Elias Sarkis,
  Jason Khoury,
  Anthony Manassa,

  Ben Volavola,
  Zac Guildford,
  Wayne Ngaluafe,
  Sione Tau,
  Daniel Ricky Kucia,
  David Lolohea,
  Albert Tuisue,
  Ned Rush Stephenson,
  Michael Ala'alatoa,

Current Super Rugby players

 Salesi Ma'afu, (Brumbies)
 Sam Wykes, (Western Force)
 Rory Sidey, (Waratahs)
 Alofa Alofa, (Waratahs)
 Cameron Orr, (Melbourne Rebels)
 Jack Debreczeni, (Chiefs)
 Michael Ala'alatoa, (Crusaders)
 Allan Alaalatoa, (Brumbies)
 Tiaan Swanepoel, (Lions)

References

Sources

External links 
Official club website
Club's 2022 Stadium Announcer

Rugby union teams in Sydney
Rugby clubs established in 1900
1900 establishments in Australia